"Radio Romance" is a song by American pop singer Tiffany, released as the second single from her second album, Hold an Old Friend's Hand (1988), in the US and first from the album in the UK and Australia. By early 1989 radio was changing and the genres played were switching to hip hop and R&B music. There was less room for young pop acts such as Tiffany. As a result, "Radio Romance" failed to achieve the success of her previous singles. It made the Top 40 in the US and managed to become a hit in the UK, where it reached #13. To promote the single in the US, Tiffany performed the song on the Mickey Mouse Club and The Arsenio Hall Show.

In Japan, the song and Tiffany were featured in TV commercials for Meiji "Lucky" chocolate sticks.

Music video
The music video for "Radio Romance" was one of Tiffany's most surreal. In the video, she plays a waitress in a diner who calls the radio request line often to request a song for her secret crush. The problem is that he is holding hands with her best friend. Later in the video, Tiffany dances with others in a what looks like a dream sequence. As the video progresses, a child appears with a magic wand which furthers the video's fantasy nature.

Track listings and formats
 7" and cassette single
 "Radio Romance" 
 "I'll Be the Girl"

 UK 7"
 "Radio Romance"
 "Can't Stop a Heartbeat"

 Japanese 3" CD single
 "Radio Romance"
 "Gotta Be Love"

Charts

References

1988 singles
Tiffany Darwish songs
MCA Records singles
1988 songs